Gallia (minor planet designation: 148 Gallia) is an asteroid from the central regions of the asteroid belt, approximately  in diameter. It was discovered on 7 August 1875, by the French brothers Paul Henry and Prosper Henry at the Paris, but the credit for this discovery was given to Prosper. It was named after the Latin name for the country of France, Gaul. Based upon its spectrum, it is an unusual G-type asteroid (GU) and a stony S-type asteroid in the Tholen and SMASS classification, respectively.

A 2007 study at the Palmer Divide Observatory in Colorado, United States, yielded a period of 20.666 ± 0.002 hours with a magnitude variation of 0.21.

This object is the namesake of the Gallia family, a small family of nearly 200 known stony asteroids that share similar spectral properties and orbital elements. Hence they may have arisen from the same collisional event. All members have a relatively high orbital inclination.

Notes

References

External links 
 Asteroid Lightcurve Database (LCDB), query form (info )
 Dictionary of Minor Planet Names, Google books
 Asteroids and comets rotation curves, CdR – Observatoire de Genève, Raoul Behrend
 Discovery Circumstances: Numbered Minor Planets (1)-(5000) – Minor Planet Center
 
 

000148
Discoveries by Paul Henry and Prosper Henry
Named minor planets
000148
000148
000148
18750807